The Hjort Trench is a linear topographic depression south of Macquarie Island in the southwest Pacific Ocean. Geologically, the depression is considered to be the seafloor expression of an ocean-ocean subduction zone, where the Australian plate is thrusting beneath the Pacific Plate. As the southernmost portion of the Macquarie Ridge Complex, the Hjort Trench lies in an area of diagonal convergence produced by the transform fault evolution of the Emerald Fracture Zone.

The trench is named in honour of the Norwegian oceanographer Johan Hjort.

Geomorphology 
To the east, the Hjort ridge follows the general curve of the trench, separating the trench from the Hjort Plateau.

Incipient subduction 
The Hjort Trench lies in an area of transpression where the plate boundary transitions from a transform boundary to a convergent one. As such, this region provides an example of how a transform boundary with a vertical or near-vertical transform fault becomes an area of under-thrusting.

See also 
Macquarie Triple Junction
Oceanic trench

References 

Plate tectonics
Macquarie Island
Oceanic trenches of the Pacific Ocean
Subduction zones